Negurenii Vechi is a commune in Ungheni District, Moldova. It is composed of four villages: Coșeni, Negurenii Vechi, Țîghira and Zăzulenii Vechi.

Notable people
 Andrei Scobioală

References

Communes of Ungheni District